Madalena is a 1960 Greek comedy film directed by Dinos Dimopoulos. It was entered into the 1961 Cannes Film Festival. The film won three awards in the 1st Thessaloniki Film Festival.

Plot
A girl lives on a small Greek island in the Aegean sea. She and her family live off the job of her father who has a little boat that ferries passengers to a neighboring island. When her father dies, she has to become the head of her family and take care of her brothers and sisters. As a working woman, she faces discrimination from the island's community. Despite many difficulties she doesn't give up. Frustrated, she decides to marry a rich farmer from the island. But the love of her main competitor overturns the situation.

Cast
 Aliki Vougiouklaki as Madalena Charidimou
 Dimitris Papamichael as Labis Yokaris
 Pantelis Zervos as the priest
 Thodoros Moridis (as Theodoros Moridis) as Giorgaras Yokaris
 Yorgos Damasiotis as police captain
 Despo Diamantidou as Mrs. Yoraki
 Smaro Stefanidou as Pipitsa
 Keti Lampropoulou as Rozina Yoraki
 Lavrentis Dianellos as Kapetan Kosmas Charidimos
 Thanasis Vengos as the policeman
 Spyros Kalogyrou as Giakoumis
 Periklis Christoforidis as Charisis
 Maria Giannakopoulou
 Thanasis Tzeneralis (as Thanos Tzeneralis) as Baroutis
 Mary Metaxa
 Panos Karavousanos (as Panagiotis Karavousanos) as an islander
 Nikos Flokas
 Elena Apergi
 Vasilis Kailas as Pantelakis Charidimos (as Vasilakis Kailas)

Awards

References

External links

1960 films
1960 comedy films
Greek comedy films
1960s Greek-language films
Greek black-and-white films
Films directed by Dinos Dimopoulos
Films set in Greece
Films set on islands
Films set in the Mediterranean Sea
Films scored by Manos Hatzidakis